The Ijem Avenue Commercial Historic District is a nationally recognized historic district located in Nichols, Iowa, United States. It was listed on the National Register of Historic Places in 2020. It is composed of 12 one and two-story commercial buildings that date from the late
nineteenth to the mid-twentieth century. It also includes one modern infill building. Nichols is a small town in western Muscatine County and was an important railroad shipping point and market town from about 1885 to about 1920. It was located along the Burlington, Cedar Rapids and Northern Railway, which came to town in 1871, and the Muscatine and Western Railroad, which arrived two years later. The two railroads intersected on the west side of the central business district, and both were incorporated into the Chicago, Rock Island and Pacific Railroad in the 1880s. The brick commercial buildings in the historic district were built during this period of time. They are attached one and two-story brick structures. The oldest buildings reflect the Italianate style with their arched windows, while the later buildings reflect the Neolassical and Commercial styles.

After the demise of the railroads in Nichols, the downtown area continued its farm-service function by focusing on highway traffic. Ijem Avenue was paved and widened in 1960 when it became part of Iowa Highway 22.

References

Italianate architecture in Iowa
Neoclassical architecture in Iowa
Chicago school architecture in Iowa
Commercial buildings on the National Register of Historic Places in Iowa
National Register of Historic Places in Muscatine County, Iowa
Historic districts on the National Register of Historic Places in Iowa
Historic districts in Muscatine County, Iowa